Iván Palanco Santiago (born 12 January 1980) is a Spanish football manager, who is the current assistant manager of Japanese club Vissel Kobe.

Career
Palanco played youth football for CE Mataró as a midfielder before being forced to retire at the age of 17 due to a serious knee injury. In 2009, he was named technical director of FC Barcelona's Academy in Fukuoka, Japan.

On 17 July 2013, Palanco was appointed manager of Thai Premier League side Ratchaburi Mitr Phol FC. He was sacked on 24 December, after three wins in nine matches, and was subsequently replaced by compatriot Ricardo Rodríguez.

From 2014 onwards, Palanco started working with Miguel Ángel Lotina, being his assistant at Al-Shahania SC, Tokyo Verdy, Cerezo Osaka, Shimizu S-Pulse, and currently, Vissel Kobe.

References

External links

1980 births
Living people
Spanish football managers
Ivan Palanco
Ivan Palanco
Spanish expatriate football managers
Spanish expatriate sportspeople in Thailand
Spanish expatriate sportspeople in Qatar
Spanish expatriate sportspeople in Japan
Expatriate football managers in Thailand